
Lake Tekapo is the second-largest of three roughly parallel lakes running north–south along the northern edge of the Mackenzie Basin in the South Island of New Zealand (the others are Lake Pukaki and Lake Ohau).

The lake is fed at its northern end by both the braided Godley River and Macauley river, which have their sources in the Southern Alps to the north. The snow melt from the Southern Alps is tinged with a light turquoise colour from the glacial silt. This gives Lake Tekapo its distinctive colour. To the east of Lake Tekapo lies the Two Thumb Range with Mount Toby (2222m); Braun Elwert Peak (2086m); Dobson Peak (2095m) and Mount Maude (1797m) amongst the mountains over looking Lake Tekapo. On the western side of Lake Tekapo. Mount John (1031m) is closest to the town with Lake Alexandrina further north and Mistake Peak (1931m) sitting towards the head of the lake. Cowans Hill (783m) lies at the southern end of Lake Tekapo behind the township and next to the Tekapo river.

The average water temperature of the surface of the lake varies between a low of between 5.8 and 5.9 degrees Celsius in September and a high of 17 degrees Celsius in January.

The lake is a popular tourist destination, and several resort hotels are located at the township of Lake Tekapo at the lake's southern end. The Lake Tekapo Regional Park, administered by Environment Canterbury, is located on the southern shore of the lake. State Highway 8 runs past Lake Tekapo at its southern end.

On a clear day, the taller snow-capped peaks of Mount Cook National Park are visible from Lake Tekapo.

An astronomical observatory is located at Mount John, which is to the north of the town, and south of the small Lake Alexandrina.

Lake Tekapo is one of the sunniest places in New Zealand with annual sunshine hours  averaging more than 2,400 each year.

In Māori culture 

In 2021, the MacKenzie District Council announced that it will start using the dual names of Tekapo and Takapō when referring to Lake Tekapo.

The legends of Ngāi Tahu speak of Lake Tekapo being one of the lakes dug by the Waitaha explorer Rākaihautū with his Polynesian digging stick which was called Tūwhakaroria. After arriving in the Uruao waka at Nelson, Rākaihautū divided his people into two groups. Rākaihautū led his group down the middle of the island, digging the South Island freshwater lakes. His son, Rakihouia, led the other group down the east coast of the South Island.

Ngāi Tahu visited Lake Tekapo and the nearby Lake Alexandrina as part of their seasonal food gathering patterns. The lakes were well known for eels and weka. These were gathered and preserved for the upcoming winter months.

Motuariki island 

Motuariki is the small island in the middle of Lake Tekapo. The legends of Ngāi Tahu tell of Motuariki, who was an ancestor on the Ārai-te-uru waka that capsized near Shag Point on the Otago coastline. After the waka capsized, many of the passengers went ashore to explore the land. Legend states that they needed to be back at the waka before daylight. Many did not make it, including Motuariki, and he was instead transformed into the island of Motuariki.

Dark Sky Reserve 
Lake Tekapo and the surrounding district were recognized as an International Dark Sky Reserve in 2012. The reserve is 4367 square kilometres in size making it amongst the world's largest. The Dark Sky Reserve accreditation recognizes that the night skies are almost completely free of light pollution and ideal for star gazing.

Lupins 
Lake Tekapo is also known for its stunning seasonal display of Lupin that bloom along its shores from around Mid November until the end of December. Russell lupins were introduced in the Mackenzie Basin in the 1940s from sowings or lupins planted in garden which had seeds that spread widely. In 1949 Connie Scott, of Godley Peaks Station, scattered lupin seeds along the roadside after purchasing about £100 worth from the local stock and station agent. Although beautiful, they modify the ecosystems of braided rivers. There were fewer lupins around Lake Tekapo in December 2020, due to the water level in the lake being too high at a vital time in their growth cycle, causing them to fail to flower.

Drivers have been warned to take care during the lupin season, as many visitors to the area slow down or pull over to admire the lupins along State Highway 8, but this may be unsafe and create the potential for accidents.

Hydroelectricity
The lake's original outflow was at its southern end, into the Tekapo River. In 1938 construction commenced on a power station, originally due to be finished in 1943 but halted in 1942 by the world war. At the same time, control gates were constructed to regulate outflows to the Waitaki Dam downstream. Work restarted in 1944, and the power station, now known as Tekapo A, came online in 1951.

Water from the lake is diverted through a  tunnel under the town to the power station, with the water originally being returned to the river. With development of the Upper Waitaki hydroelectric scheme in the 1970s, water is now fed into a  canal which leads to Tekapo B on the shores of Lake Pukaki. 

Following a turbine failure in 1986, a new Kaplan turbine was installed, with a more efficient design and higher output (42 000 HP) than the original. Today, the power station produces an average of 160 GWh annually, from a 25.2 MW capacity generator. The net head of the station is 30.5 m.

In 2008 Tekapo A and Tekapo B hydro stations were refurbished following the upgrade of Benmore and Waitaki.

On 1 June 2011, Tekapo A and B hydro power stations were transferred from Meridian Energy to Genesis Energy on instruction from the Government.

In February 2021, Genesis Energy finished an upgrade that strengthened the Tekapo A power station to withstand earthquakes. It involved five years of planning, two years of construction and cost $26.5 million. It was a challenging build to upgrade the infrastructure and tunnels which were built in the 1940s. The Tekapo A power station provides power to almost 100,000 homes.

Skifield

On the north side of the lake, 24 km from the Tekapo township is the Roundhill Ski Area situated in the Two Thumb Range, which caters primarily to beginner and intermediate skiers. For advanced skiers, Roundhill Ski area also has the world's longest and steepest rope tow which runs to the top of the Richmond Range (2133m).

Buildings and other structures

Church of the Good Shepherd 
Situated on the shores of Lake Tekapo is the Church of the Good Shepherd, which, in 1935, was the first church built in the Mackenzie Basin. The church at Lake Tekapo was designed by Christchurch architect R.S.D. Harman, based on sketches by a local artist, Esther Hope. The church is one of the most photographed in New Zealand, and features an altar window that frames views of the lake and mountains.

Bronze sheepdog 
Close to the Church of the Good Shepherd is a well-known bronze statue of a New Zealand Collie sheepdog. The statue was commissioned by Mackenzie Country residents in recognition of the indispensable role of the sheepdog in their livelihoods. The sculptor was Innes Elliott of Kaikoura, with a dog called Haig, belonging to a neighbour, being the model. Elliott reported the sculpting process took approximately fifteen months. Clay for the model came from the insulator works in Temuka, with a plaster cast of it made and sent to London in 1966, where the statue was cast.

Fishing 
Large brown and rainbow trout can be caught in Lake Tekapo.  Trolling  a lure from a boat is one option for fishing Lake Tekapo. Fishing from the shore is also possible. The best spots for fishing from the shore are to be found around the mouths of the many small streams that flow into the lake. These include the Cass River; Mistake River; Boundary Stream; Glenmore Station Tarn; Coal River and the Macauley River. In 2016 the Fish and Game Council released 45,000 baby salmon into Lake Tekapo to improve fishing stocks and a further 50,000 were released in 2020. The upper half of the Tekapo Canal will be closed to fishing over the winter of 2021 to conserve stocks while spawning. The Tekapo canal is known for very large (trophy size) rainbow trout.

References

External links 

Official Lake Tekapo Tourism Website

MacKenzie Region New Zealand
MacKenzie District Council

Lakes of Canterbury, New Zealand
Mackenzie District